Mahmut Demir (21 January 1970 in Amasya, Turkey), is a former Turkish Olympic, World and European champion sports in the super heavyweight class. He won the gold medal at the 1996 Olympics in Men's Freestyle wrestling.

Wrestling career
He was born on 21 January 1970 in Suluova district of Amasya Province in northern Turkey. Demir started wrestling in 1984. In a short time he developed into an excellent freestyle wrestler who soon moved to the top Turkish club "TEDAS" Ankara. At a height of 1.84 m, he soon grew into super heavyweight via heavyweight, usually weighing in at around 120 kg. His coaches were Alaattin Yıldırım and Nabi Bayram and national coach Yakup Topuz.

Demir started his international wrestling career at the age of 16 with a 2nd place at the Balkan Junior Championships in Sonbor. From 1986 to 1990 he then competed regularly at the Junior World and European Championships. In 1990, he won the title of European Junior Heavyweight Champion.

He made his senior debut with a 5th place in the heavyweight division at the 1989 World Championships in Martigny/Switzerland. He achieved this place with a 2:0 points victory over Sandor Kiss from Hungary. At the 1990 European Wrestling Championships in Poznan, Demir won his first senior medal with a 3rd place in the heavyweight category. In the fight for this bronze medal he defeated the junior world champion Heiko Balz from the German Democratic Republic.

In 1991 Demir won another bronze medal at the European Championships in Stuttgart, but this time in the super heavyweight division. In a preliminary round fight he suffered a shoulder defeat at the hands of the German champion Andreas Schröder.

In 1992, the year of the Olympics, Demir was runner-up in the European super heavyweight championship in Kaposvár. In the final he was again beaten by Andreas Schröder. At the Olympic Games in Barcelona, he narrowly missed out on a medal with a 4th place after losing to David Gobejishvili from The Unified Team and Jeff Thue from Canada.

Mahmut Demir's most successful years began after the 1992 Olympic Games. As early as 1993 he became European super heavyweight champion in Istanbul with a victory over Murabi Valiev from the Ukraine. In 1994 he finished 2nd at the European Championships in Rome, this time behind Valiev , but was able to celebrate winning his first world title at the World Championships in Istanbul. In the final he defeated Olympic champion Bruce Baumgartner from the USA 1:0 on points.

In 1995 Demir won against Murabi Valiev in Freiburg and thus his second European Championship title. At the World Championships of the same year in Atlanta, he lost to Bruce Baumgartner and finished 5th.

The Olympic year 1996 was the highlight of Mahmut Demir's career. In the spring he became European champion for the third time in Budapest in superior style and won the gold medal at the Olympic Games in Atlanta. In the final he defeated Aleksey Medvedev from Belarus, the son of the Olympic champion Aleksandr Medved, 3:0 on points.

After this victory, Demir retired from active wrestling. He is now a businessman in Amasya. He is married and has with two children.

A sports hall in his hometown Suluova is named after him, where the 2006 European Champion Clubs Freestyle Wrestling Cup was held.

Achievements
 1986 Balkan Juniors Championship in Sombor, Yugoslavia - silver (130 kg)
 1986 World Juniors Championship in Schifferstadt, FR Germany - 6th (100 kg)
 1986 European Escoir Championship in Linköping, Sweden - 4th (100 kg)
 1987 Balkan Juniors Championship in Thessaloniki, Greece - silver (130 kg)
 1987 European Championship in Katowice, Poland - bronze (115 kg)
 1988 European Escoir Championship in Wałbrzych, Poland - 5th (130 kg)
 1988 European Juniors Championship in Constanţa, Romania - silver (100 kg)
 1989 World Escoir Championship in Ulan Bator, Mongolia - silver (100 kg)
 1989 World Championship in Martigny, Switzerland - 5th (100 kg)
 1990 Balkan Juniors Championship in Sakarya, Turkey - gold (100 kg)
 1990 European Escoir Championship in ?, Finland - gold (100 kg)
 1990 European Championship in Poznań, Poland - bronze (100 kg)
 1990 World Championship in Tokyo, Japan - 7th (100 kg)
 1990 World Cup in Toledo, Ohio, United States - bronze
 1991 World Championship in Varna, Bulgaria - 5th (130 kg)
 1991 Mediterranean Games in Athens, Greece - gold (130 kg)
 1991 European Championship in Stuttgart, Germany - bronze (130 kg)
 1992 World Cup in Moscow Russia - 4th
 1992 European Championship in Kaposvár, Hungary - silver (130 kg)
 1992 Olympics in Barcelona, Spain - 4th (130 kg)
 1993 European Championship in Istanbul, Turkey - gold (130 kg)
 1994 European Championship in Rome, Italy - silver (130 kg)
 1994 World Championship in Istanbul, Turkey - gold (130 kg)
 1995 European Championship in Fribourg, Switzerland - gold (130 kg)
 1995 World Cup in Chattanooga, Tennessee, United States - bronze (130 kg)
 1995 World Championship in Atlanta, Georgia, United States - 5th (130 kg)
 1996 European Championship in Budapest, Hungary - gold (130 kg)
 1996 Olympics in Atlanta, Georgia, United States - gold (130 kg)

References

External links
 

1970 births
Living people
People from Amasya
Wrestlers at the 1992 Summer Olympics
Wrestlers at the 1996 Summer Olympics
Turkish male sport wrestlers
Olympic gold medalists for Turkey
Olympic wrestlers of Turkey
Olympic medalists in wrestling
Medalists at the 1996 Summer Olympics
Mediterranean Games gold medalists for Turkey
Competitors at the 1991 Mediterranean Games
Mediterranean Games medalists in wrestling
20th-century Turkish people
21st-century Turkish people